Dyckia delicata is a plant species in the genus Dyckia. This species is native to Brazil.

References

delicata
Flora of Brazil